Jack Goes Home is a 2016 American independent horror film written and directed by Thomas Dekker and starring Rory Culkin, Daveigh Chase, Nikki Reed, Britt Robertson, Lin Shaye, Natasha Lyonne, Louis Hunter, and Serge Levin. The film premiered at the South by Southwest international film festival and was theatrically released on October 14, 2016.

Plot
After his father is killed in a car crash, Jack (Rory Culkin) travels home to Colorado to help nurse his drug addicted mother (who was also injured in the crash) back to health. He is cursed by his past, and it takes a dark sinister turn when Jack finds a message from his late father, containing a clue that leads him on a mind bending  scavenger hunt. There he uncovers long buried secrets and lies within his soul, family, history, his parents, his friends, and his very mind.

Cast 
 Rory Culkin as Jack
 Daveigh Chase as Shanda
 Britt Robertson as Cleo
 Lin Shaye as Teresa
 Nikki Reed as Crystal
 Natasha Lyonne as Nancy
 Louis Hunter as Duncan

References

External links 

2016 films
2016 horror films
American horror thriller films
2010s English-language films
2010s American films